Óscar Adalberto Quiroz Ayala (born 3 July 1994) is a Colombian cyclist, who currently rides for UCI Continental team .

Major results
2017
 3rd Road race, National Road Championships
2018
 1st Gran Premio Comité Olímpico Nacional
 1st Stage 2 Clásico RCN
 2nd Road race, National Road Championships
 6th Overall Vuelta a Costa Rica
1st Stage 9
 9th Gran Premio FECOCI
2019
 1st  Road race, National Road Championships
2021
 1st Stage 9 Vuelta a Colombia

References

External links

1994 births
Living people
Colombian male cyclists
Sportspeople from Nariño Department
21st-century Colombian people